James "Jim" Michael Fyfe is an American actor, writer TV host, theatre director, and acting coach from Piermont, New York. Since 2003, he worked at Rockland Country Day School in Congers, New York. He started as a history teacher before becoming the school's Admissions Director, later its Assistant Headmaster, Upper Division Head, and then the school's Operations Administrator while continuing to teach History. In 2015, he began working alongside comedic television host Stephen Colbert, as a producer on the CBS program The Late Show with Stephen Colbert. Fyfe was also best known for being the co-host from 1988-89 on The Dr. Fad Show, starring Ken Hakuta. He was then replaced by David Sterry, who co-hosted the show from 1989 until the series end in 1994. His first marriage, which ended in divorce, was to Leslie Klein, daughter of actress Brett Somers.

Filmography

Buy Me That! A Kids' Survival Guide to TV Advertising and Buy Me That Too

In the late 80s, Fyfe starred as himself in the Buy Me That! series. The specials teach children about the ways commercials can be manipulative, for example making products appear better in commercials than they are in real life, or by using product placement.

References

External links

Living people
American television hosts
People from Piermont, New York
Male actors from New York (state)
Year of birth missing (living people)
Place of birth missing (living people)